The 2015 Prosperita Open was a professional tennis tournament played on clay courts. It was the 12th edition of the tournament which was part of the 2015 ATP Challenger Tour. It took place in Ostrava, Czech Republic between 27 April and 3 May.

Singles main-draw entrants

Seeds

 1 Rankings are as of April 20, 2015

Other entrants
The following players received wildcards into the singles main draw:
  Zdeněk Kolář
  Patrik Rikl
  David Poljak
  Dominik Kellovský

The following players received entry from the qualifying draw:
  Dušan Lojda
  Marek Michalička
  Grzegorz Panfil
  Pascal Brunner

Champions

Singles

 Íñigo Cervantes def.  Adam Pavlásek, 7–6(7–5), 6–4

Doubles

 Andrej Martin /  Hans Podlipnik Castillo def.  Roman Jebavý /  Jan Šátral, 4–6, 7–5, [10–1]

References
 Combo Main Draw

External links
Official Website

Prosperita Open
Prosperita Open
Prosperita Open
Prosperita Open
Prosperita Open